The Boyne River is a river in the municipality of Seguin, Parry Sound District in Central Ontario, Canada. It is part of the Great Lakes Basin, and flows from Otter Lake to its mouth at Georgian Bay on Lake Huron south of the town of Parry Sound.

Oastler Lake Provincial Park is at the outflow of the Boyne River from Otter Lake to Oastler Lake.

The outflows from Otter Lake and Oastler Lake are controlled by dams.

References

Sources

Rivers of Parry Sound District
Tributaries of Georgian Bay